KCHK-FM (95.5 FM) is a radio station broadcasting a classic country format. Licensed to New Prague, Minnesota, United States, the station is currently owned by Ingstad Brothers Broadcasting, LLC and features programming from ABC Radio .

History
The station went on the air as KCHK-FM on January 21, 1988. On July 11, 2002, the station changed its call sign to KRDS-FM, and back to KCHK-FM on April 3, 2013.

References

External links

Radio stations in Minnesota
Radio stations established in 1988
Classic country radio stations in the United States